PWW may refer to:

 People's World, a Marxist and American leftist national daily online news publication
 Pollokshaws West railway station, Glasgow, National Rail station code